In mathematics, a quasisymmetric homeomorphism between metric spaces is a map that generalizes bi-Lipschitz maps. While bi-Lipschitz maps shrink or expand the diameter of a set by no more than a multiplicative factor, quasisymmetric maps satisfy the weaker geometric property that they preserve the relative sizes of sets: if two sets A and B have diameters t and are no more than distance t apart, then the ratio of their sizes changes by no more than a multiplicative constant. These maps are also related to quasiconformal maps, since in many circumstances they are in fact equivalent.

Definition

Let (X, dX) and (Y, dY) be two metric spaces. A homeomorphism f:X → Y is said to be η-quasisymmetric if there is an increasing function η : [0, ∞) → [0, ∞) such that for any triple x, y, z of distinct points in X, we have

Basic properties

 Inverses are quasisymmetric  If f : X → Y is an invertible η-quasisymmetric map as above, then its inverse map is -quasisymmetric, where 

Examples

Weakly quasisymmetric maps

Not all weakly quasisymmetric maps are quasisymmetric. The appeal of this result is that proving weak-quasisymmetry is much easier than proving quasisymmetry directly, and in many natural settings the two notions are equivalent.

δ-monotone maps

A monotone map f:H → H on a Hilbert space H is δ-monotone if for all x and y in H,

To grasp what this condition means geometrically, suppose f(0) = 0 and consider the above estimate when y = 0. Then it implies that the angle between the vector x and its image f(x) stays between 0 and arccos δ < π/2.

These maps are quasisymmetric, although they are a much narrower subclass of quasisymmetric maps. For example, while a general quasisymmetric map in the complex plane could map the real line to a set of Hausdorff dimension strictly greater than one, a δ-monotone will always map the real line to a rotated graph of a Lipschitz function L:ℝ → ℝ.

Doubling measures

The real line

Quasisymmetric homeomorphisms of the real line to itself can be characterized in terms of their derivatives. An increasing homeomorphism f:ℝ → ℝ is quasisymmetric if and only if there is a constant C > 0 and  a doubling measure μ on the real line such that

Euclidean space

An analogous result holds in Euclidean space. Suppose C = 0 and we rewrite the above equation for f as 

Writing it this way, we can attempt to define a map using this same integral, but instead integrate (what is now a vector valued integrand) over ℝn: if μ is a doubling measure on ℝn and

then the map

is quasisymmetric (in fact, it is δ-monotone for some δ depending on the measure μ).

Quasisymmetry and quasiconformality in Euclidean space

Let  and  be open subsets of ℝn.

Quasi-Möbius maps
A related but weaker condition is the notion of quasi-Möbius maps where instead of the ratio only the cross-ratio is considered:

Definition

Let (X, dX) and (Y, dY) be two metric spaces and let η : [0, ∞) → [0, ∞) be an increasing function. An η-quasi-Möbius homeomorphism f:X → Y is a homeomorphism for which for every quadruple x, y, z, t of distinct points in X, we have

See also
Douady–Earle extension

References

Homeomorphisms
Geometry
Mathematical analysis
Metric geometry